Chachersk District, Čačerski Rajon is a district of Gomel Region, in Belarus.

Districts of Gomel Region